Bread crumbs are small particles of dry bread.

Bread crumb(s) or breadcrumb(s) may also refer to:
Breadcrumbs (film), a 2016 film
Breadcrumb (navigation), a navigation technique used in user interfaces
"Breadcrumbs" (Once Upon a Time), an episode of the television series Once Upon a Time
Breadcrumb sponge, common name for Halichondria panicea, a species of marine demosponge